Hyperolius glandicolor is a species of frog in the family Hyperoliidae. It is known from southern Somalia, Kenya, Tanzania, Rwanda, and Burundi. The limits of its distribution, however, are uncertain, and it might also occur in Malawi, Mozambique, Uganda, and even eastern Democratic Republic of the Congo. Common name Peters reed frog has been coined for it.

Hyperolius glandicolor occurs in emergent vegetation at swamp, river, and lake margins in all types of savanna, grassland, and bush land habitats, as well as in many anthropogenic habitats, such as cultivated land, towns, and gardens. It is able to rapidly colonize new bodies of water. Breeding takes usually place in temporary, but often also in permanent ponds, ranging from very small to very large ones. The eggs are deposited directly into the water. No threats to this very common and adaptable species are known. It occurs in many protected areas.

References

glandicolor
Frogs of Africa
Amphibians of Burundi
Amphibians of Kenya
Amphibians of Rwanda
Amphibians of Somalia
Amphibians of Tanzania
Amphibians described in 1878
Taxa named by Wilhelm Peters
Taxonomy articles created by Polbot